Posey Field  is a city-owned public-use airport located three nautical miles (4 mi, 6 km) northeast of the central business district of Haleyville, a city in Winston County, Alabama, United States.

This airport is included in the FAA's National Plan of Integrated Airport Systems for 2011–2015 and 2009–2013, both of which categorized it as a general aviation facility.

Facilities and aircraft 
Posey Field covers an area of 120 acres (49 ha) at an elevation of 930 feet (283 m) above mean sea level. It has one runway designated 18/36 with an asphalt surface measuring 5,008 by 100 feet (1,526 x 30 m).

For the 12-month period ending April 22, 2010, the airport had 10,185 general aviation aircraft operations, an average of 27 per day. At that time there were 14 aircraft based at this airport: 79% single-engine, 7% multi-engine, 7% jet and 7% ultralight.

See also 
 List of airports in Alabama

References

External links 
 Aerial image as of 18 January 1999 from USGS The National Map
 

Airports in Alabama
Transportation buildings and structures in Winston County, Alabama